The hashtag #NotAllMen is a feminist Internet meme. 
A shortening of the phrase "not all men are like that", sometimes abbreviated "NAMALT", it is a satirical parody of arguments used to deflect attention away from men in discussions of sexual assault, the gender pay gap, and other feminist issues.

Origins and usage

Response to feminist discourse
The phrase "not all men are like that" has been in use online since the mid-2000s as a general defense of men.
It was used as a catchphrase among men's rights activists (MRAs) in response to online discussions of misogyny or sexual abuse which they saw as blaming all men as perpetrators.

Jess Zimmerman writes that before 2013, "not all men" was absent from discussions of popular derailment tactics used in response to feminist discourse; in its place were phrases such as what about the men?' and 'patriarchy hurts men too'—pleas for inclusion, not for exemption".
Zimmerman also highlights a use of the phrase dating to 1985 in Joanna Russ's novel On Strike Against God, where a character muses:

Earlier use of the phrase have been cited to Charles Dickens in 1836.
Writing at The Awl, John Herrman lists additional uses of the phrase as far back as 1863.

Popularization as a meme
Kelsey McKinney writes at Vox that the phrase "not all men" has been "reappropriated by feminists and turned into a meme meant to parody its pervasiveness and bad faith."
Both the phrase and hashtag "#NotAllMen" have been used as a satire of defensive reactions by men.
The first appearance of the meme in popular media was a satirical tweet by Shafiqah Hudson in 2013 that quickly went viral:

The following year, the phrase was added to an image of the Kool-Aid man crashing through a wall,
a Tumblr page featured images in which a speech bubble with the phrase "not all men" was added to images from movies such as the shark from Jaws and the chestburster from Alien,
and artist Matt Lubchansky created a webcomic with the character "Not-All-Man", in which the "defender of the defended" and "voice for the voiceful" breaks through a glass window to interrupt a pink-haired woman complaining about men.
The comic was retweeted and reblogged tens of thousands of times, and shared by celebrities including Wil Wheaton, Paul F. Tompkins, Matt Fraction, and John Scalzi.

Other #NotAllMen-related memes include references to Aquaman, Adventure Time, and Magic: The Gathering.

2014 Isla Vista killings

#NotAllMen was already a Twitter hashtag before the 2014 Isla Vista killings, but it gained additional traction after the event, because of the hatred against women expressed by the killer.
In response to the "not all men" argument, an anonymous Twitter user created the hashtag #YesAllWomen to express that all women are affected by sexism and misogyny.
This newly created hashtag was used by women to share their experiences of sexual discrimination and attacks on social media.

Bengaluru incident
After reports of a mass molestation occurring at India's Bengaluru New Year's Eve celebration in 2017, #NotAllMen began trending on Twitter.
This drew an angry reaction from women, with many Indian feminists and women strongly criticizing the hashtag while responding with their own hashtag #YesAllWomen.

See also

References

Further reading

External links
 Postings to #NotAllMen on Twitter
 Origin on "NotAllMen as gathered on Storify
 Not *all* men... on Tumblr

Feminism
Men's rights
Hashtags
Internet memes introduced in the 2010s